Raagam is a 1975 Indian Malayalam film, directed by A. Bhimsingh and produced by N. P. Ali. The film stars Sharada, Lakshmi, Sukumari, Adoor Bhasi, Jose Prakash and Master Natraj in the lead roles. The film has musical score by Salil Chowdhary. It was a remake of the Hindi film Anuraag (starring Ashok Kumar, Nutan, Rajesh Khanna, Mousumi Chaterjee and Vinod Mehra).

Cast
 
Sharada as Priyamvada
Sukumari as Gomati
Adoor Bhasi as Vishwanatha Menon
Jose Prakash as Dr. Jayachandran
Lakshmi as Sreedevi
Mohan Sharma as Madhusudanan
Prema as School teacher
Sankaradi as Dharmapalan
Bahadoor as Gopalan
Mallika Sukumaran as Blind school teacher
T. P. Madhavan as Priest
Kaviyoor Ponnamma as Blind school principal
Master Nadarajan as Babu

Soundtrack
The music was composed by Salil Chowdhary.

Awards
 Filmfare Award for Best Film - Malayalam won by N.P. Ali (1975)

References

External links
 

1975 films
1970s Malayalam-language films
Malayalam remakes of Hindi films
Films directed by A. Bhimsingh
Films scored by Salil Chowdhury